Voloshcha is a village (selo) in Drohobych Raion, Lviv Oblast, in south-west Ukraine. It belongs to Medenychi settlement hromada, one of the hromadas of Ukraine.

The local Catholic parish was first mentioned in 1425.

References 

Villages in Drohobych Raion